Epiplema anomala is a species from the genus Epiplema. The species was originally described by Anthonie Johannes Theodorus Janse in 1932.

References

Taxa named by Anthonie Johannes Theodorus Janse
Uraniidae